Iténez is a province in the Beni Department, Bolivia.

References

Provinces of Beni Department